Giuseppe Raffaele (born 5 December 1975) is an Italian professional association football coach, currently in charge of  club Potenza.

Playing career 
Raffaele's playing career was amassed entirely in the amateur leagues of Sicily and Calabria as a striker, and started in 1991 at Marsala. Then he played for Igea Virtus, Sciacca, Sancataldese, Locri, Vittoria, Monturanese, Castrovillari and Scalea. In 2006 he retired due to a serious injury.

Coaching career 
He started his coaching career in 2006 with small Sicilian amateurs Due Torri, which he led in 2011 up to the national promotion playoff finals of the Eccellenza league.

After a season at Eccellenza level with Akragas, in 2013 he guided Orlandina to win promotion to Serie D. After being sacked in February 2014, he was hired in December 2014 by Igea Virtus, the club from his hometown, which he guided to win promotion to Serie D by the end of the season.

He stayed on as a Igea Virtus head coach until 2018, after which he was hired by ACR Messina, with whom however he did not even start the season. Later in October 2018 he was instead given his first professional job, as the new head coach of Serie C's Potenza, guiding the Rossoblu to a fifth and fourth place in the two seasons in charge of the club.

He was subsequently hired as new head coach of Catania for the 2020–21 season. However, he was sacked on 18 March 2021 following a string of negative results.

On 4 October 2021, Raffaele took over as the new head coach of Serie C club Viterbese, replacing Alessandro Dal Canto. He was sacked himself a month later, on 7 November 2021, due to poor results.

On 25 October 2022, he returned to Potenza, agreeing a contract until 30 June 2023 with an option to extend it for one more year.

References 

1975 births
Catania S.S.D. managers
Living people
People from Barcellona Pozzo di Gotto
Italian footballers
Italian football managers
Association football forwards
Footballers from Sicily
Serie C managers
Sportspeople from the Province of Messina